California's 29th State Senate district is one of 40 California State Senate districts. It is currently represented by Democrat Josh Newman of Fullerton.

District profile 
The district straddles the intersection of three counties: Los Angeles, Orange, and San Bernardino. Centered on the Chino Hills and the northern Santa Ana Valley, it includes arms extending into the unincorporated community of Ramona in the north and the city of Cypress in the west.

Los Angeles County – 1.7%
 Diamond Bar
 Industry – 6.4%
 Ramona
 Rowland Heights
 Walnut
 West Covina – 28.7%

Orange County – 22.7%
 Anaheim – 58.2%
 Brea
 Buena Park – 23.8%
 Cypress
 Fullerton
 La Habra
 La Palma
 Placentia
 Stanton
 Yorba Linda

San Bernardino County – 3.7%
 Chino Hills

Election results from statewide races

List of senators 
Due to redistricting, the 29th district has been moved around different parts of the state. The current iteration resulted from the 2011 redistricting by the California Citizens Redistricting Commission.

Election results 1992 - present

2020

2018 (Recall)

2016

2012

2008

2004

2000

1996

1994 (special)

1992

See also 
 California State Senate
 California State Senate districts
 Districts in California

References

External links 
 District map from the California Citizens Redistricting Commission

29
Government of Los Angeles County, California
Government in Orange County, California
Government of San Bernardino County, California
Government of Anaheim, California
Government of Fullerton, California
Brea, California
Buena Park, California
Chino Hills (California)
Chino Hills, California
Cypress, California
Diamond Bar, California
City of Industry, California
La Habra, California
La Palma, California
Placentia, California
Walnut, California
West Covina, California
Yorba Linda, California